KDMC-FM (88.7 FM) is a radio station licensed to Van Buren, Missouri, United States. The station is currently owned by Southeast Missouri State University and simulcasts its KRCU public radio station based in Cape Girardeau.

History
The Federal Communications Commission issued a construction permit for the station on May 29, 1998. The station was assigned the KBIY call sign on August 10, 1998, and received its license to cover on June 26, 2001. Under its original owner, the New Life Evangelistic Center, KBIY was part of the Here's Help Network of Christian radio programming.

New Life sold the station to Southeast Missouri State University for $45,000 in 2019; the station was to be used to bring NPR to the Poplar Bluff area, with the transmitter to be moved to Elsinore, Missouri. Under new call letters KDMC-FM—previously associated with the former student-run station at the Cape Girardeau campus—the station returned to the air on May 14, 2020.

On April 1, 2021 The FCC granted KDMC a frequency change from 91.3 FM to 88.7 FM and moved its transmitter to Ellsinore, Missouri.

References

External links

DMC-FM
Radio stations established in 2001
2001 establishments in Missouri